Kitchen Stuff Plus Inc. is a Canadian retailer in housewares and home decor. The company operates 25 stores in the Greater Toronto Area, London, Innisfil, Hamilton, and St. Catherines

History 
In 1987, CEO Mark Halpern started Kitchen Stuff Plus as a booth at the Pickering flea market to pay for university. With the large success of the booth, in 1993 he opened a pop-up store at Yonge and Bloor in Toronto, becoming the company's first full-time store. Mark Halpern passed away in September 2022.

The fast growing company launched their first website in 2000 and was well on their way to opening their fourth and fifth stores. In 2003, they were awarded the Global Innovator Award for Canada by the International Housewares Association. By 2009, Kitchen Stuff Plus had 11 stores across the Greater Toronto Area. In 2010, Kitchen Stuff Plus started their now famous Warehouse Sale in North York. Kitchen Stuff Plus has joined the Retail Council of Canada and has been a part of the Fairfax company since 2013.

Awards 

 Excellence in Retail Marketing Award for our Back To School campaign in 2017.

References

External links
 Official website

Canadian companies established in 1987
Retail companies established in 1987